Joseph ben Mordechai Gershon HaKohen Ka"tz (1510 in Cracow – 1591) was a kohen by birth, a rabbi and Talmudist, who began his studies in the Talmud at an early age, and became the dean (rosh yeshivah) at a yeshiva founded for him by his father-in-law. His views on religious questions were widely sought, while Solomon Luria was one of his correspondents.

Joseph was the author of "She'erit Yosef" (Cracow, 1590), containing responsa and discussions on various rabbinical subjects, as well as a commentary on the "Mordechai" tractates Nezikin, Berakot, and Mo'ed. In the preface the author states that he published this work at the request of his sons, Tanhuma and Aaron Moses, who were members of the Jewish community of Cracow. He also corrected the manuscript from which was printed the "Aggudah" of Alexandri HaKohain of Frankfurt.

Jewish Encyclopedia bibliography
She'rith Yosef
 I. M. Zunz, 'Ir ha-zedek, p. 23, Lemberg, 1874;
 Rabinowitz, Ha'arot we-Tikunim, p. 6, Lyck, 1875;
 Dembitzer, Kelilat Yoft, p. 4b, Cracow, 1888;
 B. Friedberg, Gesch. der Hebräischen Typographie in Krakau, p. 8, ib. 1900.S.

References

1510 births
1591 deaths
Kohanim writers of Rabbinic literature
Rabbis from Kraków
16th-century Polish rabbis